The Cobble is a mountain in Schoharie County, New York. It is located northeast of Summit. Meade Hill is located southwest and Fulton Hill is located east-southeast of The Cobble.

References

Mountains of Schoharie County, New York
Mountains of New York (state)